The 1882 Franklin North by-election  was a by-election held on 9 June 1882 during the 8th New Zealand Parliament in the rural South Auckland electorate of .

The by-election was caused by the election of Benjamin Harris in the  being declared void on a petition of the losing candidate Frank Buckland. Chief Justice James Prendergast, and Justice Gillies declared the election void. Allegations were made of "intimidation".
 
However Benjamin Harris won the subsequent by-election.

Results
The following table gives the election result:

References 

Franklin North 1882
1882 elections in New Zealand
Politics of the Auckland Region
1880s in Auckland